The CD44 antigen is a cell-surface glycoprotein involved in cell–cell interactions, cell adhesion and migration. In humans, the CD44 antigen is encoded by the CD44 gene on chromosome 11. CD44 has been referred to as HCAM (homing cell adhesion molecule), Pgp-1 (phagocytic glycoprotein-1), Hermes antigen, lymphocyte homing receptor, ECM-III, and HUTCH-1.

Tissue distribution and isoforms 

CD44 is expressed in a large number of mammalian cell types.  The standard isoform, designated CD44s, comprising exons 1–5 and 16–20 is expressed in most cell types. CD44 splice variants containing variable exons are designated CD44v.  Some epithelial cells also express a larger isoform (CD44E), which includes exons v8–10.

Function 

CD44 participates in a wide variety of cellular functions including lymphocyte activation,  recirculation and homing, hematopoiesis, and tumor metastasis.

CD44 is a receptor for hyaluronic acid and can also interact with other ligands, such as osteopontin, collagens, and matrix metalloproteinases (MMPs).  CD44 function is controlled by its posttranslational modifications. One critical modification involves discrete sialofucosylations rendering the selectin-binding glycoform of CD44 called HCELL (for Hematopoietic Cell E-selectin/L-selectin Ligand). (see below)

Transcripts for this gene undergo complex alternative splicing that results in many functionally distinct isoforms; however, the full length nature of some of these variants has not been determined. Alternative splicing is the basis for the structural and functional diversity of this protein, and may be related to tumor metastasis.  Splice variants of CD44 on colon cancer cells display sialofucosylated HCELL glycoforms that serve as P-, L-, and E-selectin ligands and fibrin, but not fibrinogen, receptors under hemodynamic flow conditions pertinent to the process of cancer metastasis.

CD44 gene transcription is at least in part activated by beta-catenin and Wnt signalling (also linked to tumour development).

HCELL
The HCELL glycoform was originally discovered on human hematopoietic stem cells and leukemic blasts, and was subsequently identified on cancer cells. HCELL functions as a "bone homing receptor", directing migration of human hematopoietic stem cells and mesenchymal stem cells to bone marrow.   Ex vivo glycan engineering of the surface of live cells has been used to enforce HCELL expression on any cell that expresses CD44. CD44 glycosylation also directly controls its binding capacity to fibrin and immobilized fibrinogen.

Clinical significance 

The protein is a determinant for the Indian blood group system.
 CD44, along with CD25, is used to track early T cell development in the thymus.
 CD44 expression is an indicative marker for effector-memory T-cells. Memory cell proliferation (activation) can also be assayed in vitro with CFSE chemical tagging.

In addition, variations in CD44 are reported as cell surface markers for some breast and prostate cancer stem cells. In breast cancer research CD44+/CD24- expression is commonly used as a marker for breast CSCs and is used to sort breast cancer cells into a population enriched in cells with stem-like characteristics and has been seen as an indicator of increased survival time in epithelial ovarian cancer patients.

Endometrial cells in women with endometriosis demonstrate increased expression of splice variants of CD44, and increased adherence to peritoneal cells.

CD44 variant isoforms are also relevant to the progression of head and neck squamous cell carcinoma.

Monoclonal antibodies against CD44 variants include bivatuzumab for v6.

CD44 in cancer 

CD44 is a multistructural and multifunctional cell surface molecule involved in cell proliferation, cell differentiation, cell migration, angiogenesis, presentation of cytokines, chemokines, and growth factors to the corresponding receptors, and docking of proteases at the cell membrane, as well as in signaling for cell survival. All these biological properties are essential to the physiological activities of normal cells, but they are also associated with the pathologic activities of cancer cells. Experiments in animals have shown that targeting of CD44 by antibodies, antisense oligonucleotides, and CD44-soluble proteins markedly reduces the malignant activities of various neoplasms, stressing the therapeutic potential of anti-CD44 agents.

High levels of the adhesion molecule CD44 on leukemic cells are essential to generate leukemia. Furthermore, because alternative splicing and posttranslational modifications generate many different CD44 sequences, including, perhaps, tumor-specific sequences, the production of anti-CD44 tumor-specific agents may be a realistic therapeutic approach.

In many cancers (renal cancer and non-Hodgkin's lymphomas are exceptions), a high level of CD44 expression is not always associated with an unfavorable outcome. On the contrary, in some neoplasms CD44 upregulation is associated with a favorable outcome. This is true of prostate cancer, where the transcript variant CD44v5 (includes the fifth 'v5' exon) is associated with better prognosis (increased time to recurrence following surgery). In prostate cancer, the exclusion of the v5 exon through alternative splicing was associated with the presence of RNA binding protein KHDRBS1 and became included in the presence of increased YTHDC1 or metadherin expression.

In other cases different research groups analyzing the same neoplastic disease reached contradictory conclusions regarding the correlation between CD44 expression and disease prognosis, possibly due to differences in methodology. These problems must be resolved before applying anti-CD44 therapy to human cancers.

Interactions 

CD44 has been shown to interact with:

 ARHGEF1,
 Ezrin, via PIP2,
 Epidermal Growth Factor Receptor (Hyaluronan-dependent),
 Fibrin and immobilized fibrinogen,
 Fibronectin,
 FYN,
 Hyaluronan,
 Lck,
 Osteopontin
 Selectins, and
 Src,
 CD74.

References

Further reading

External links 

 Indian blood group system at BGMUT Blood Group Antigen Gene Mutation Database at NCBI, NIH
 Articles at IHOP.
 

Clusters of differentiation
Blood antigen systems
Transfusion medicine
Glycoproteins